Andrew Thomas Carroll (May 7, 1985 – January 22, 2018) was an American professional ice hockey player who most notably played in the American Hockey League (AHL).

Playing career
Prior to turning professional, while going undrafted Carroll attended the University of Minnesota Duluth where he played four seasons of college hockey with the NCAA Division I Minnesota–Duluth Bulldogs men's ice hockey team.

On July 18, 2013, Carroll returned to his original AHL club, signing a one-year contract with the Hartford Wolf Pack.

After a one-year hiatus, Carroll returned to professional hockey in signing a one-year ECHL contract with former club, the Idaho Steelheads on August 27, 2015.

Death
Chicago police responded to the outside lanes of Terminal 2 in Chicago's O'Hare Airport at 4:30 a.m. on Sunday, January 21, after receiving a call of a “person down”. It was reported Carroll had "trauma to his head." Camera recordings revealed that it appeared that Carroll had "jumped from the upper level roadway to the lower level roadway on his own accord." He was initially taken to Resurrection Hospital in critical condition.

On January 22, 2018, the University of Minnesota Duluth released a statement that Carroll had died at the age of 32. The Carroll family revealed in their statement that Carroll died as a result of a fall at Chicago's O'Hare Airport on January 22, 2018. The University of Minnesota Duluth men's hockey team announced that they would wear special "AC" commemorative stickers on their helmets for the remainder of the 2017–18 season. The medical examiner's office ruled the death a suicide. In April 2019, Carroll was later diagnosed with chronic traumatic encephalopathy by Boston University researchers.

References

External links

1985 births
2018 suicides
Abbotsford Heat players
American men's ice hockey left wingers
Bakersfield Condors (1998–2015) players
Connecticut Whale (AHL) players
Greenville Road Warriors players
Hartford Wolf Pack players
Hershey Bears players
Ice hockey players from Minnesota
Ice hockey players with chronic traumatic encephalopathy
Idaho Steelheads (ECHL) players
Minnesota Duluth Bulldogs men's ice hockey players
People from Shoreview, Minnesota
Peoria Rivermen (AHL) players
Sioux Falls Stampede players
Suicides by jumping in the United States
Suicides in Illinois